The Flugausstellung Peter Junior, previously the Flugausstellung Hermeskeil, is a private aviation museum in the town of Hermeskeil in the German state of Rhineland-Palatinate.
 
The museum opened in July 1973 in several buildings with a covered area of over 3,600 square meters. Today, it is home to over 100 civilian and military aircraft displayed on a 76,000 square meter site.

Collection

 Aérospatiale SE 3130 Alouette II M-234
 Aérospatiale SE 3130 Alouette II V-248
 Antonov An-2T 16247310
 Antonov An-26 52+08
 Aero L-39 Albatross 28+30
 Bell UH-1D Iroquois 72+31
 Blériot XI
 Boeing-Stearman PT-18 40-1964
 Brantly B-2 93
 Bristol Sycamore 78+33
 Canadair Sabre JC+101
 CASA 2.111 BR.2I-14
 CASA 352L T.2B-127
 Concorde – replica
 Convair F-102 Delta Dagger 56-1125
 Dassault Mirage IIIR 310
 Dassault Mirage V BA-35/54
 Dassault Super Mystère B.2
 de Havilland Dove XJ348
 de Havilland Comet 4C G-BDIW
 de Havilland Venom FB.4 J-1797
 Dornier Alpha Jet 40+61
 Dornier Do 27A-1 56+53
 Dornier Do 28D-2 4050
 Douglas C-47A Skytrain 42-100997
 English Electric Lightning F.2A XN782
 English Electric Canberra B(I).8 XM264
 F+W C-3605 C-541
 Fairey Gannet XL450
 Fiat G.91R/3 MM5257
 Fiat G.91R/3 30+86
 FAG Stettin La.11 Landmann – replica
 Fokker Dr.I – replica
 Focke Hartz FoHa 1 80
 Fouga CM.170 Magister 93+03
 Fouga CM.170 Magister 410
 Grade monoplane
 Handley Page Jetstream T.2 XX476
 Hawker Sea Hawk FGA.6 XE327
 Hawker Hunter F.6A XF418
 Hawker Hunter Mk.58 J-4098
 Hawker Siddeley Harrier GR.3 XZ998
 Horten XVc
 Hütter H-17B
 Hunting Percival Jet Provost XE670
 Ilyushin Il-14P 14803076
 Ilyushin Il-18D DDR-STH
 Kamov Ka-26 7404609
 LET Z-37 Čmelák D-ESSJ
 Lockheed T-33A 94+39
 Lockheed T-33A 95+17
 Lockheed F-104G Starfighter FX60
 Lockheed F-104G Starfighter 20+43
 Lockheed F-104G Starfighter 26+61
 Lockheed RF-104G Starfighter 24+91
 Lockheed Super Constellation D-ALIN
 Lilienthal Normalsegelapparat – replica
 MBB Bo 105CB S-133
 MBB Bo 105P 87+08
 McDonnell Douglas F-4C Phantom II 63-7421
 McDonnell Douglas F-4C Phantom II 63-7583
 McDonnell Douglas RF-4C Phantom II 68-0587
 Mikoyan-Gurevich MiG-15UTI
 Mikoyan-Gurevich MiG-17F
 Mikoyan-Gurevich MiG-21F-13 741217
 Mikoyan-Gurevich MiG-21SPS 22+36
 Mikoyan-Gurevich MiG-21SPSK
 Mikoyan-Gurevich MiG-21MF 23+44
 Mikoyan-Gurevich MiG-21US 24+08
 Mikoyan-Gurevich MiG-21bis 24+24
 Mikoyan-Gurevich MiG-23MF 20+01
 Mikoyan-Gurevich MiG-23BN 20+46
 Mikoyan-Gurevich MiG-23ML 20+19
 Mil Mi-1M W401031
 Mil Mi-2 543620074
 Mil Mi-2 562945063
 Mil Mi-4A 02139
 Mil Mi-6A 715309B
 Mil Mi-8T 94+20
 Mil Mi-9 93+95
 Mil Mi-14PL 95+02
 Mil Mi-24P 96+50
 Nord 1002 Pingouin II 91
 Nord Noratlas 52+56
 North American F-100F Super Sabre 56-4014/56-3944
 North American AT-6F Texan 44-81778
 North American Rockwell OV-10B Bronco 99+16
 Panavia Tornado XX948
 Percival Pembroke C.54 54+21
 Percival Pembroke C.54 54+24
 Piasecki H-21C Shawnee 83+11
 Piper J3C Cub
 Raab Doppelraab IV 254
 Republic F-84F Thunderstreak BF+105
 Republic F-84F Thunderstreak DE+254
 Republic RF-84F Thunderflash EB+341
 Republic F-105F Thunderchief 62-4417
 Santos-Dumont Demoiselle – replica
 Saab J 35E Draken 35931
 Saab ASJF 37 Viggen 374974
 Scheibe L-Spatz 55 724
 Scheibe Mü 13 E Bergfalke II 2
 Schleicher Ka-4 Rhönlerche II 211
 SEPECAT Jaguar GR.1 XX955
 Sikorsky S-64 Skycrane
 Sukhoi Su-7B 5309
 Sukhoi Su-22M4 25+16
 Tupolev Tu-134A DDR-SCK
 Westland Wasp HAS.1 XS569
 Westland Whirlwind HAR.10 XD186
 Westland Whirlwind HAR.10 XP352
 Westland Wessex HC.2 XR527
 Westland Wessex HC.2 XT670
 Westland Scout XR633
 Westland Sioux AH.1 XT548
 Vickers VC10 G-ARVF
 Vickers Viscount D-ANAM
 Vinten Vi 122 UMA-01

See also
List of aerospace museums

References

External links

Museum Homepage (German)

Museums in Rhineland-Palatinate
Aerospace museums in Germany